Bridget Josephine "Bridie" O'Mullane (born 4 March 1895 - died 1969/1970), was a recruiting officer for Cumann na mBan during the Irish War of Independence and the Director of Publicity and Propaganda during the Irish Civil War.

Biography
 
Bridget Josephine Mullane was born 4 March 1895 in Sligo to Bridget ( McCaffery) and James Mullane. Her father was a Royal Irish Constable while her mother ran a drapery shop in the town. Count Plunkett was visiting the town of Sligo in 1917 following his victory as Sinn Féin MP in the North Roscommon by-election and stayed with the Mullane family on Grattan Street. Countess Plunkett told O'Mullane about Cumann na mBan and how they were recruiting and needed a branch in Sligo. By 1918 O'Mullane was a member the Executive of Cumann na mBan. She had founded branches in County Sligo and went on to work all over the country.

She was arrested on 3 November 1918 for selling flags without a permit, to raise funds for the organisation. She was also arrested when she was visiting her father in prison, for carrying seditious literature and later during the civil war, acting on the Anti-Treaty side O'Mullane was arrested and imprisoned in Kilmainham Gaol. Her cell was left decorated with graffiti, slogans and drawings that are still visible. She went on to be appointed Director of Publicity and Propaganda during the Irish Civil War.

During her time as a political prisoner in Kilmainham Gaol O'Mullane was appointed Officer Commanding of the prisons A Wing. She conducted negotiations with the prison commander on their behalf. She was also reportedly assaulted by the police while in custody.

After the war O'Mullane was a member of the Friends of Soviet Russia and took part in various conferences between workers. She died at age 74 and is buried in the Republican Plot in Glasnevin Cemetery.

Sources

1895 births
People from County Sligo
Bridie O'Mullane
Irish feminists
Irish republicans
Irish women's rights activists
Women in war in Ireland
Date of death unknown